Abdul Rahman Saif Al Ghurair is an Emirati businessman and chairman of the prominent Emirati business conglomerate, the Al Ghurair Group.

Career
Al Ghurair has chaired the Al Ghurair board since 2008, and since 2003 has been a board member of Abdul Rahman Saif Al Ghurair Investments and Mashreq Bank, the oldest privately held bank in the Emirates. He has been a member of the Dubai Economic Council since 2003. He also serves on the board of the Commercial Bank of Dubai, Oman Insurance Company, and Masafi Mineral Water. He also serves on the boards of the Commercial Bank of Dubai, Otis Elevator Company Middle East and the National Cement Company. He is the chairman of Al Ghurair Exchange. From 2008 till 2015 Al Ghurair served as chairman of Dubai Chamber of Commerce, where he implemented the Dubai: Capital of the Islamic Economy initiative.

Personal life
Al Ghurair is the son of Emirati businessman Saif Ahmad Al Ghurair, the founder of the Al Ghurair Group. He has 5 brothers. In 2011 he was awarded the Lifetime Achievement Award by the Middle East Business Leadership Award.

References

1959 births
Living people
Emirati business executives

Emirati bankers